This is a list of airports in Turkmenistan, sorted by location.

Airports

There was also previously a Soviet Air Force base at Mary-2.

See also
 Transport in Turkmenistan
 List of airports by ICAO code: U#UT - Tajikistan, Turkmenistan, Uzbekistan
 Wikipedia: WikiProject Aviation/Airline destination lists: Asia#Turkmenistan

References

https://theaviationgeekclub.com/the-unknown-story-of-the-soviet-mig-29-aggressor-unit-tasked-to-simulate-usaf-f-15-fighters/ - more on 1521st Aviation Base
http://www.weathergraphics.com/tim/russia/Bekdash.htm - Bekdash civilian airfield
http://www.weathergraphics.com/tim/russia/Cheleken.htm - small civilian airfield
http://www.weathergraphics.com/tim/russia/Mary-2.htm - Mary-2 military airfield
Tim Vasquez, Russian Airfield Index (covers all former Soviet Union)

 (Kerki International Airport)

 
Airports
Airports
Turkmenistan
Turkmenistan